CachyOS is a Linux distribution based on the Arch Linux operating system, with the end goal of simpler installing and customizing, and improved performance while remaining compatible.

History 
CachyOS was developed by Peter Jung (ptr1337) and Vladislav Nepogodin (vnepogodin). The name CachyOS originated from the Cachy scheduler, which was the old name of the cacULE scheduler. Peter was involved in testing and developing cacULE, with Hamad. Later, he grew interested in creating an optimized Linux operating system for x86-64-v3 packages. They were later joined by Piotr Gorski (sir_lucjan).

Features

Kernel 
CachyOS uses its own optimized kernel, which uses the BORE Scheduler by default. CachyOS also provides some other schedulers like CFS, PDS, BMQ, TT, and cacULE.

File system 
The file systems XFS, Btrfs, F2FS, Ext4, and ZFS are available on CachyOS; XFS is the default. The command-line interface (CLI) installer, written in C++, provides the same functions as the graphical user interface (GUI) installer but it offers more customizing and features than the GUI, and is recommended for advanced users. It also supports configuration, allowing users an automated install.

CachyOS includes tools like CachyOS Hello, Package Installer, Kernel Manager for new Linux users.

Desktop environments 

CachyOS desktop environments and window managers include CuteFish, i3 window manager, KDE Plasma 5, GNOME, Openbox, LXQt, bspwm, Xfce, Hyprland, UKUI, and Cinnamon.

KDE Plasma is the default CachyOS environment, and includes Nord and Emerald Themes. CachyOS also provides customizing for all other provided desktop environments.

Security 
CachyOS includes security features like a hardened Linux kernel, Hardened-Anonymized-DNSCrypt-Proxy (A toggle for anonymized dnscrypt configuration and use of only dnscrypt servers), Preconfigured DNS Servers using DoH and DoT, Firejail for sandboxing untrusted applications.

Browser 
CachyOS's default web browser is Cachy Browser, a software fork of the LibreWolf Browser. It includes added security improvements such as compiling with more secure flags and performance enhancements.

System requirements 
CachyOS system requirements vary depending on the desktop environment chosen, generally, a PC with 1 GHz processor, 3 GB of random-access memory (RAM), 30 GB of free computer data storage space, such as hard disk drives, and a broadband internet connection (for online installation) are needed.

CachyOS recommends having a x86-64-v3 supported processor, 4 GB of RAM, 50 GB of free disk space and a 50 mbps or better internet connection, for online installation. Newer Nvidia graphics processing units (GPUs) are recommended while old cards are also supported. CachyOS supports systemd-boot and GRUB as the bootloader.

Installation 
CachyOS offers two different installers: a GUI and a CLI. The graphical installer is based on Calamares and allows for both offline and online personalized installations with package selection.

The official CachyOS website provides optical disc image (ISO) images that can be run from a bootable USB flash drive with at least 4 GB of storage space, depending on the ISO image chosen. After preparing the USB device with a tool like Ventoy, they can insert the thumb drive and boot into it from the BIOS. Calamares based GUI Installer will start the installation process.

CachyOS uses a rolling release update model in which new packages are supplied throughout the day. Software packages are updated using the Pacman package manager.

References

External links 
 
 

Arch-based Linux distributions
Linux distributions
Pacman-based Linux distributions